Oliver Municipal Airport  is a registered aerodrome located adjacent to Oliver, British Columbia, Canada. The airport has been considered for expansion.

The aerodrome is the home of Okanagan-Kooteney Air Cadet Gliding Program, Atom Helicopters, Transwest Helicopters, Oliver Osoyoos Search and Rescue (OOSAR) and Oliver Fire Department (OFD).

History
The aerodrome was listed with three runways as follows:

See also
 List of airports in the Okanagan

References

External links

 Official site

Registered aerodromes in British Columbia
Regional District of Okanagan-Similkameen
Airports in the Okanagan
Royal Canadian Air Force stations
Military airbases in British Columbia
Military history of British Columbia